Eois agroica is a moth in the family Geometridae. It is found in Mexico.

References

Moths described in 1913
Eois
Moths of Central America